Christian Patterson (born 1972, in Fond du Lac, Wisconsin, U.S.) is an American photographer known for his Sound Affects and Redheaded Peckerwood series which have received solo exhibitions and been published as books. Redheaded Peckerwood was awarded the Rencontres d'Arles Author Book Award in 2012 and Patterson has been awarded a Guggenheim Fellowship and the Vevey International Photography Award.

Biography 
In 2002, Patterson moved from Brooklyn, New York to Memphis, Tennessee to work with the photographer William Eggleston. In 2005, he completed his first project, Sound Affects, a collection of color photographs that explore Memphis as a visual and musical place, and use light and color as visual analogues to sound and music. In 2008, a Sound Affects book was published by Edition Kaune, Sudendorf.

Also in 2005, Patterson began working on his second project, Redheaded Peckerwood, which is loosely inspired by the late 1950s killing spree of Charles Starkweather and Caril Ann Fugate across Nebraska. Photographs are the heart of this work, but they are complemented and informed by documents and objects that belonged to the killers and their victims. Later that year, Patterson moved back to New York.

In 2011, a Redheaded Peckerwood book was published by Mack and named one of the best photobooks of the year by many critics. The book was nominated for the 2012 Kraszna-Krausz Book Awards and won the 2012 Recontres d'Arles Author Book Award. It is introduced in The Photobook: A History, Vol. 3, edited by Gerry Badger and Martin Parr.

In 2015, Patterson completed Bottom of the Lake, a project revisiting his hometown of Fond du Lac, Wisconsin (French for "Bottom of the Lake"). A book was published by Koenig Books and takes the form of a facsimile of the artist's family's 1973 telephone book from Fond du Lac, with Patterson's own photographs, drawings and notes inserted. Like Redheaded Peckerwood, this new work mixes large-format colour landscapes, black-and-white snapshots, appropriated and manipulated archival images, and studio still lifes. As an installation and exhibition, the work includes an interactive rotary telephone object and wooden sculpture.

Publications

By Patterson 
 Sound Affects. Cologne: Edition Kaune, Sudendorf, 2008. .
 Redheaded Peckerwood.
 Self-published, 2010.
 Mack version. Essays by Lucy Sante and Karen Irvine. Includes three inserts, an illustrated booklet and (in the third edition) a facsimile postcard.
 London: Mack, 2011. .
 2nd edition. London: Mack, 2012. .
 3rd edition. London: Mack, 2013. .
 Bottom of the Lake.
 Oakland, CA: TBW Books, 2013. . Subscription Series #4, Book #1. Edition of 1500. Patterson, Alessandra Sanguinetti, Raymond Meeks and Wolfgang Tillmans each had one book in a set of four.
 Berlin: Koenig, 2015. .

With others 
 Lost Home. Tokyo: Super Labo, 2013. . A slipcase containing a 24-page soft-bound book each by Harvey Benge, JH Engström, Roe Ethridge, Takashi Homma, Ron Jude, Daidō Moriyama, Christian Patterson, Slavica Perkovic, Bertien van Manen, Terri Weifenbach, and a 32-page prose poem by Nobuyuki Ishiki. Japanese and English text. Edition of 1000 copies, 200 with a white cover and 800 with green.
 AP CP BL – Ahorn Paper 1, Christian Patterson, Bottom of the Lake. Berlin: Ahorn Books, 2016. . Contains two interviews with Patterson and contributions by Gerry Badger, Thomas Weski, and Lucy Sante. 144 pages.

Solo exhibitions 
 2003: Another Time, Another Place, and You, Southside Gallery, Oxford, MS.
 2005: Sound Affects, Power House, Memphis, TN; Yancey Richardson Gallery, New York, NY, 2006; Robert Koch Gallery, San Francisco, CA, 2007; Kaune-Sudendorf Contemporary, Cologne, Germany, 2008
 2012: Sound Affects & Redheaded Peckerwood, Robert Morat Galerie, Hamburg, Germany.
 2013: Redheaded Peckerwood, Rose Gallery, Santa Monica, CA.
 2015: Bottom of the Lake, Robert Morat Galerie, Berlin, Germany.

Awards 
 2012: Rencontres d'Arles Author Book Award for Redheaded Peckerwood.
 2013: Guggenheim Fellowship.
 2015: 2015–2016 Vevey International Photography Award, Vevey, Switzerland. A grant of CHF 40,000 (around USD 42,000) to realize his project Gong Co, about a closed Chinese grocery store in the Mississippi Delta whose shelves remained stocked with decades-old products.

References 
Notes

Citations

External links 
 

1972 births
American photographers
Living people